Jasia Reichardt (born 1933) is a British art critic, curator, art gallery director, teacher and prolific writer, specialist in the emergence of computer art. In 1968 she was curator of the landmark Cybernetic Serendipity exhibition at London's Institute of Contemporary Arts. She is generally known for her work on experimental art.
After the deaths of Franciszka  and Stefan Themerson she catalogued their archive and looks after their legacy.

Her own self-description reads: Jasia Reichardt writes, lectures and organises events about subjects which deal with the relationship of art to other areas of human activity such as architecture, science, technology.
She was assistant director of the ICA, director of the Whitechapel Art Gallery, and tutor at the AA. She has written books on art,  computers, robots and the future.

Childhood
Jasia Reichardt was born to Maryla and Seweryn Chaykin in Warsaw, Poland, in 1933. Her mother was an illustrator and pianist and her father an architect and engineer. An assimilated middle-class Jewish family, they were overwhelmed by the German invasion of Poland in 1939 and were incarcerated among the capital's Jewish population in the Warsaw Ghetto. Jasia survived there for a while with her mother and grandmother who tried to shield her from the unfolding horror. In 1942 she was smuggled out, but both her parents were murdered in the Holocaust. She was subsequently hidden under an assumed identity by a series of Poles, spending time in a convent, until she was able to join her mother's sister, Franciszka Themerson, and her husband, Stefan Themerson, in London in 1946. She attended Dartington Hall school. and then went  to study production at the Old Vic Theatre School in London.

Career

In the 1950s she was assistant editor of Art News and Review, for which she wrote numerous reviews, as well as exhibition introductions for various galleries of contemporary art. In the early 1960s she was the general editor of the "Art in Progress" series published by Methuen. She organised various exhibitions of new art, and in 1963 – 1971 was assistant director of the ICA 

In 1968, she organised the ground-breaking Cybernetic Serendipity exhibition, and edited the special issue of Studio International, which replaced the catalogue. The same year, she curated Fluorescent Chrysanthemum, an exhibition of contemporary experimental Japanese art. Other exhibitions followed, including Play Orbit of objects to play with by British artists.

From 1974 to 1976 Reichardt was director of the Whitechapel Art Gallery. Between 1989 and 1998 she was one of the directors of Artec biennale in Nagoya. In 1998 she curated Electronically Yours, an exhibition of electronic portraiture at the Tokyo Metropolitan Museum of Photography. 
Apart from writing and organising exhibitions, she broadcast on the arts programme, "Critics’ Forum" for the BBC, 1965 – 1977.  She collaborated with artists and continued to focus on the intersection of the arts and science on which she wrote a monthly column in the New Scientist.  After 1990, she collaborated on various projects with Nick Wadley, until his death in 2017. 
She has taught at the Architectural Association and other colleges. After 1988, she organised the archive of Franciszka and Stefan Themerson; the 3 volume catalogue of the archive was published in 2020 and distributed by MIT.

She served on numerous committees; belonged to a number of professional organisations, gave lectures at conferences, and received several distinctions.

Personal life
Jasia Reichardt was married first to Tony Richards (later Reichardt), art dealer and collector, and secondly to art historian and artist Nick Wadley.

Exhibitions organised by JR
in London unless otherwise indicated

 Image in Progress (first exhibition of Pop Art in London), Grabowski Gallery, 1962
 The Inner Image (between painting and sculpture), Grabowski Gallery, 1964
 Art in Britain 1930-40 (A tribute to Sir Herbert Read), Marlborough Fine Art and New London Gallery, 1965
 Between Poetry and Painting, ICA, 1965
 London Under Forty, Galleria Milano, Milan, 1966
 Essays in Narrative, Zwemmer Gallery, London, 1966
 Ventures, (experimental works in three dimensions), Arts Council touring exhibition, 1967
 Cybernetic Serendipity, ICA, 1968, also in Washington and San Francisco
 Fluorescent Chrysanthemum (new Japanese art, music and films), ICA, 1968–69, and Vancouver
 Play Orbit (playthings by artists), ICA, 1969–70
 Ten Sitting Rooms (created by artists), ICA, 1970
 Time, Words and the Camera (photoworks by British artists), Künstlerhaus, Graz, 1976–77
 Electronically Yours, Tokyo Metropolitan Museum of Photography, 1988
 Yolanda Sonnabend, House of Memory, Galeria Stara, Lublin, 2001
 Nearly Human, Łaźnia Centre for Contemporary Art II, Gdańsk, 2015
 Nick  in Europe, 12 Star Gallery, London, 2018
 Nick in Gdańsk, Łaźnia Centre for Contemporary Art II, Gdańsk, 2019
 Fluorescent Chrysanthemum Remembered, Łaźnia Centre for Contemporary Art I, Gdańsk, 2019

Bibliography

Articles in regular magazine series:

 Monthly column. Architectural Design. 1963-79
 Column on modern art. Apollo, 1960–63
 'Developments in Style.' The London Magazine, 1962–64
 Column on art in London. Art d'aujourd'hui, 1962–66
 'Comment.' Studio International, 1965–69
 'Art at large,' on the connections between art and science. New Scientist, 1971–74
  Monthly column. Building Design, 1982–88
  Contributor to Artefactum, 1984–86
  Contributor to Cedal, Puerto Rico, 1986

Books written by:

 Victor Pasmore. Art in Progress series. London: Methuen & Co 1962. ASIN: B0000CLE70
 Yaacov Agam. Art in Progress series. London: Methuen. 1966. ASIN: B0006BSCLM
 The Computer in Art. London: Studio Vista. 1971
 Robots: Fact, Fiction, and Prediction. Thames & Hudson. 1978 
 Magdalena Abakanowicz. New York: Abbeville Press. 1982. ISBN 0896593231.
 Fifteen Journeys from Warsaw to London. London: Dalkey Archive Press. 2012. 

Books edited by:

 Series of 13 monographs on living artists 'Art in Progress', Methuen, 1962–66
 Hausmann, Raoul and Schwitters, Kurt; ed. Jasia Reichardt. PIN, Gaberbocchus Press (1962); Anabas-Verlag, Giessen. 1986
 Cybernetics, art, and ideas. Studio Vista. 1971
 Stefan Themerson - Collected Poems, Gaberbocchus Press/Uitgeverij De Harmonie, Amsterdam, 1997
 Stefan Themerson – Wiersze Wybrane 1939 – 1945, Wydawnictwo Uniwersytetu Śląskiego, Katowice, 2004
 Kurt Schwitters: Three Stories, Tate Publishing, 2010
 Unposted Letters [of] Franciszka and Stefan Themerson, Gaberbocchus & De Harmonie, Amsterdam, 2013
 The Themerson Archive Catalogue, MIT, 2020

Books contributed to:

 "Multiples" in The Year’s Art, Penguin Books, 1974
 "Op Art" in Concepts of Modern Art, Penguin Books, 1974
 "Art and Cybernetics" in Le Temps et la Cybernetique, Micromégas, 1975
 "After Malraux" in 360 degrees around Katsuhiro Yamaguchi, Rikuyo-sha Publishing Inc., 1981
 "Die Paradoxe mechanijsche Lebens" in Wunschmaschine Welterfindung, Springer, Vienna, 1966
 "In the beginning", White Heat Cold Logic, MIT, 2009
  "A meeting with Borges", with Borges, My Work in Prose, Obscure Publications, 2010
 "Borges", with Borges, My life in Books, Obscure Publications, 2010

Texts in exhibition catalogues include:

 Janina Baranowska. London: Grabowski Gallery. 1962. ASIN: B00MAPQH32
 Marc Vaux/Tess Jaray. London: Grabowski Gallery. 1963. ASIN: B0016702SG
 Peter Schmidt - Autobiographical Mono Prints. London: Lisson Gallery. 1970. ASIN: B00C3YNUP8
 Paul Van Hoeydonck Space Sculpture. London: Annely Juda Fine Art. 1973. ASIN: B001E0DNUY
 Folon, Jean-Michel; Reichardt, Jasia. FOLON "Catalogue of an exhibition organised by the Belgian Ministry of French Culture and held at the Institute of Contemporary Arts Gallery 21 April - 29 May 1977". 1977. London: Institute of Contemporary Arts Gallery. 1977. ASIN: B0010LNM3A
 Margaret Priest. Recent Drawings. London: Waddington Fine Art. 1980. ASIN: B002GE5TB8
 Liliane Lijn: Imagine the Goddess. London: Fischer Fine Art exhibition catalogue. 1987
 Karl Gerstner, First London Exhibition. Marlborough Fine Art (London) Ltd. 1999. ISBN 978-0900955785
 Andrew Logan, an Adventure in Art. Museum of Modern Art, Oxford. 1999. ISBN 978-0905836737
 Uncanny Valley: Recent Sculptures by Tim Lewis. Liverpool: National Museums and Galleries on Merseyside. 2004. ASIN: B00LXOO5V2
 Piero Fogliati - The Poet of Light. Turin, 2004. 
 Swinging London - The Grabowski Collection. Museum of Art in Łódź (Łódź: Muzeum Sztuki). 2007 

Journals and magazines contributed to: AA files, Ambit, Architectural Review, Art Monthly, Art International, Art News, Arte Oggi, Arts, Arts Review, Artscribe, Arts Review, Billedkunst, Bonhams magazine, The British Journal of Aesthetics, Cambridge Opinion, Cimaise, Connoisseur, The Creative Holography Index, Domus, Eye, Image Roche, The Independent, Interdisciplinary Science Reviews, Konteksty, Das Kunstwerk, Kwartalnik Literacki, Leonardo, Marmo, Metro, Museumjournaal, Opus, Pagina, Pa`renthesis, Penrose Annual, Pix 1, Progressive Architecture, Quadrum, The Royal Academy Magazine, RSA Journal, Skira Annuel, Studio International, Sunday Times, Typographica, L'Uomo e l'Arte, Vytvarne Umeni, Zodiac, and others

See also 
 Algorithmic art
 Computer Art
 Electronic art
 Generative art
 New media art
 Virtual art
 Post-conceptual art

References

1933 births
Polish emigrants to the United Kingdom
Alumni of Bristol Old Vic Theatre School
British women curators
British curators
Art museum people
British art historians
Women art historians
British digital artists
Women digital artists
New media artists
Living people
British critics
Warsaw Ghetto inmates
Postmodernists
Mass media theorists
Cultural historians
Polish translators
Translators from Polish
Polish–English translators
20th-century Polish women writers
21st-century Polish women writers